Darko Bošković (born 16 September 1987) is a Serbian-born Montenegrin football midfielder playing with Swedish amateur side IFK Stocksund.

Club career
He started playing in 2004 for his hometown club FK Mladost Apatin. Being loaned to clubs like FK Big Bull Bačinci and FK Palić to gain experience, he did get to play two matches for Mladost in 2006–07 when the club competed in the SuperLiga. In the next seasons he stayed with the club in the Serbian First League, second tier, where he became an important player in the team. In December 2008, he moved to another First League club, FK Spartak Subotica, that ended being an excellent move since the club gained promotion to the Serbian SuperLiga where he played the 2009–10. In the following season he played the first half with Spartak, however during winter break he moved to OFK Grbalj playing in the Montenegrin First League. At summer 2011 he was back in Serbia this time to play with FK Timok. He later had a spell with OFK Odžaci in the Serbian League Vojvodina.

International career
He is a former member of the Montenegro national under-21 football team.

References

External links
 Darko Bošković at Srbijafudbal
 

1987 births
Living people
People from Apatin
Association football midfielders
Serbia and Montenegro footballers
Montenegrin footballers
Montenegro under-21 international footballers
FK Mladost Apatin players
FK Palić players
FK Spartak Subotica players
OFK Grbalj players
FK Timok players
MFK Tatran Liptovský Mikuláš players
FK Proleter Novi Sad players
FK Drina Zvornik players
FK Mladost Doboj Kakanj players
OFK Bačka players
FK Odžaci players
Vasalunds IF players
Second League of Serbia and Montenegro players
Serbian SuperLiga players
Montenegrin First League players
2. Liga (Slovakia) players
Serbian First League players
Premier League of Bosnia and Herzegovina players
Ettan Fotboll players
Division 2 (Swedish football) players
Montenegrin expatriate footballers
Expatriate footballers in Slovakia
Montenegrin expatriate sportspeople in Slovakia
Expatriate footballers in Bosnia and Herzegovina
Montenegrin expatriate sportspeople in Bosnia and Herzegovina
Expatriate footballers in Sweden
Montenegrin expatriate sportspeople in Sweden